Jim Grabb was the defending champion, but lost in the first round this year.

Dan Goldie won the tournament, beating Andrew Castle in the final, 6–3, 6–7, 6–0.

Seeds

  Andre Agassi (second round)
  Eliot Teltscher (semifinals)
  John Fitzgerald (quarterfinals)
  John Frawley (quarterfinals)
  Dan Goldie (champions)
  Jim Grabb (first round)
  Joey Rive (quarterfinals)
  Todd Nelson (quarterfinals)

Draw

Finals

Top half

Bottom half

References

External links
 Main draw

Singles